Dalane may refer to:

Places
Dalane, a traditional district in the southwestern part of Norway
Dalane (Kristiansand), a neighbourhood in the city of Kristiansand in Vest-Agder, Norway

Other
Dalane prosti, a Church of Norway deanery serving an area in southwestern, Norway
Dalane District Court, a district court located in Egersund, Norway
Dalane Tidende, a local newspaper published in Egersund, Norway